Il giorno della Shoah is a 2010 Italian language film written and directed by Pasquale Squitieri.

References

External links

Films directed by Pasquale Squitieri
2010s Italian-language films
2010 television films
2010 films
Italian drama films
Italian television films
2010s Italian films